Woodbourne Airport  trading as Marlborough Airport is a small, controlled airport located 8 km west of Blenheim in the Marlborough region of New Zealand, on , Middle Renwick Road. It is co-located with RNZAF Base Woodbourne in the Wairau Valley on the north-eastern corner of the South Island of New Zealand.
The airport has a single terminal and 7 tarmac gates.

History
Woodbourne was one of the first airports in New Zealand. Today it is one of the few remaining air force bases (RNZAF Base Woodbourne) with general maintenance and initial training conducted there.

It serves as the civil airport for Blenheim. Runway 06R/24L was sealed for Fokker Friendships in 1961 and was one of the first regional airports in the country to take turboprop aircraft.

Today it has more frequent operations, with Air New Zealand using Bombardier Q300 aircraft from Auckland and Wellington. The busiest route from Blenheim remains across the Cook Strait to Wellington, 80 km to the north-east; flights take only 25 minutes. Sounds Air operates Cessna Caravan and Pilatus PC-12 aircraft from Wellington, Kapiti Coast and Christchurch.

The terminal building was renovated in 2014/15 to cope with growing passenger demand and increased use by larger aircraft types. The redevelopment included an extension of the apron along with new check-in, baggage claim facilities and extension of the departure lounge.

The airport was the 12th busiest in New Zealand during 2018, based on passenger numbers.

Airlines and destinations

Passenger

See also

 List of airports in New Zealand
 List of airlines of New Zealand
 Transport in New Zealand

References

External links

 
 New Zealand AIP 4 AD

Airports in New Zealand
Transport in the Marlborough Region
Buildings and structures in the Marlborough Region
Transport buildings and structures in the Marlborough Region